Moma Airport  is an airport in Sakha Republic, Russia, located  east of Khonuu, Momsky District. It handles small transport aircraft and contains an extremely spartan layout.

Airlines and destinations

See also
Moma Natural Park

References 

Airports built in the Soviet Union
Airports in the Sakha Republic